Ruellia affinis, also known as red ruellia or wild petunia, is a vine native to Brazil, which is usually used as an ornamental plant.

Description

Growing to around 1–1.2 metres tall in a bright shady area, the plant is a rambling shrub that features short-petioled elliptic leaves that are 5 inches in length. 

It is a winter-bloomer with showy, 2-inch wide scarlet-coloured trumpet flowers, in addition to being a vine, which is unusual for a ruellia species.

Habitat
The species is endemic to Northeast and Southeast regions of Brazil in the states of Bahia and Espírito Santo. The species is found in the phytogeographic domain of the Atlantic forest, in regions with rain forest vegetation.

Gallery

References

affinis
Flora of Brazil
Plants described in 1885
Garden plants of South America
Vines